Dabas is an Indian family name. Notable people with the surname include:

 Jayender Kumar Dabas (born 1968), Councillor ward-36 Rani Khera and Ex Leader of the house NDMC
 Ankit Dabas (born 1992), Indian cricketer
 Parvin Dabas (born 1974), Indian actor, model and director
 Sunil Dabas, Indian female Kabbadi coach

References

Indian surnames